Ectoedemia uisebi is a moth of the family Nepticulidae. It was described by Wolfram Mey in 2004. It is known from Namibia.

References

Nepticulidae
Moths of Africa
Moths described in 2004